Asadul Habib Dulu is a Bangladesh Nationalist Party politician and the former Member of Parliament from Lalmonirhat Sadar. He was a deputy minister of food and disaster management during 2001 to 2006.

Career
Dulu is the organizing secretary, Rangpur division, of Bangladesh Nationalist Party.

Corruption charges
In October 2007,  the Anti-Corruption Commission (ACC) released a list of 35 graft suspects which including Dulu. However, in October 2008, ACC exempted him from the graft charges due to lack of enough evidence but they filed a charge on misappropriating 201 pieces of corrugated iron sheets against Dulu.

On 24 January 2009, ACC filed a case against Dulu accusing him for amassing illegal wealth and concealing wealth information in the statements submitted to the commission in February 2007. In September, they pressed the charge sheet.

References

Living people
People from Lalmonirhat District
Bangladesh Nationalist Party politicians
6th Jatiya Sangsad members
8th Jatiya Sangsad members
Year of birth missing (living people)
Place of birth missing (living people)